Darkon is a feature-length documentary film that follows the real-life adventures of the Darkon Wargaming Club in Baltimore, Maryland, a group of fantasy live-action role-playing (LARP) gamers. The film was directed by Andrew Neel and Luke Meyer.

Darkon premiered and won the Best Documentary Audience Award at the 2006 South by Southwest (SXSW) Film Festival in Austin, Texas. Darkon was an official selection playing at Hot Docs, Maryland Film Festival, Silverdocs, LA Film Festival, Britdoc, Melbourne International Film Festival and the Camden International Film Festival.

The film was produced by Ovie Entertainment and SeeThink Films.

John Hodgman was hired to write a scripted film adaptation of the documentary. However plans fell through, but an excerpt of the unproduced screenplay was read on his podcast Judge John Hodgman.

Reception 
Darkon was well received by critics. The film has an 89% rating on Rotten Tomatoes, based on the reviews of 19 critics.

References

External links
 

The Darkon Wargaming Club - official site of the role-playing club on which the film is based

2006 films
American documentary films
Live-action role-playing games
2006 documentary films
Films shot in Baltimore
SeeThink Films films
Films directed by Andrew Neel
2000s English-language films
2000s American films